Issues related to race and sports have been examined by scholars for a long time. Among these issues are racial discrimination in sports as well as the observation that there are overrepresentations and underrepresentations of different races in different sports.

Participation and performance disparities

Sprinting 
In 1991, Namibian (formerly South-West Africa) Frankie Fredericks became the first sub-10-second 100 metres runner of non-West African heritage and in 2003 Australia's Patrick Johnson (who has Irish and Indigenous Australian heritage) became the first to achieve the feat without an African background.

In 2010, Frenchman Christophe Lemaitre became the first white European under ten seconds, (although Poland's Marian Woronin had unofficially surpassed the barrier with a time of 9.992 seconds in 1984). In 2011, Zimbabwean Ngonidzashe Makusha became the 76th man to break the barrier, yet only the fourth man not of West African descent. No sprinter from South Asia, East Africa or North Africa has officially achieved this feat. In 2015 Su Bingtian of China became the first ethnic East Asian athlete to officially break the 10 second barrier and British athlete Adam Gemili—who is of mixed Iranian and Moroccan descent—became the first athlete with either North African or Middle Eastern heritage to break the ten second barrier. Before the 2004 Athens Games, 494 of the top 500 times for the 100m were held by sprinters who were of West African descent.

Olympic 100 m medallists in the early phase of the Modern Olympic Games were principally white, Western sprinters of European descent, largely reflecting the euro-centric make up of the nations that took part and the ideological environment of racial segregation at the time. As the Olympic competition began to attract wider international participation, athletes with African heritage began to reach and eventually dominate the 100 m Olympic podium, particularly African-Americans and Afro-Caribbeans.

Eddie Tolan became the first non-white winner of the event in 1932 and this signified the start of a prolonged period of success by black male sprinters; since 1932 only five men's Olympic champions in the event have not had significant African heritage. The women's event was dominated by runners of European descent until Wilma Rudolph won the title in 1960. Soviet and German women returned to the podium in the period from 1972 to 1980, but since then African-American and Jamaican women have won the great majority of 100 m medals. Dominance in the men's event has been particularly pronounced from 1984 to 2016, during which time in a span of almost 40 years all the men's Olympic 100 m finalists have been of African heritage.

In the 2020 Olympics, Chinese sprinter Su Bingtian ran 9.83 in his semi-final heat and became the first athlete without African heritage to run sub-9.90 or sub-9.85 and the first athlete without African heritage to reach the final since 1980 within the span of 40 years, setting the fastest 60 metres split record en route. 9.83 is also the second fastest semi-final time and made him the fifth fastest man in the history of 100 metres at the Olympics behind Usain Bolt, Yohan Blake, Justin Gatlin and Marcel Jacobs.

Endurance running 
Many Nilotic groups also excel in long and middle distance running. Jon Entine has argued that this sporting prowess stems from their exceptional running economy. This in turn is a function of slim body morphology and slender legs, a preponderance of slow twitch muscle fibers, a low heart rate gained from living at high-altitude, as well as a culture of running to school from a young age. A study by Pitsiladis et al. (2006) questioning 404 elite distance runners from Kenya found that 76% of the international-class respondents hailed from the Kalenjin ethnic group and that 79% spoke a Nilotic language.

Joseph L. Graves argues that Kenyan athletes from the African Great Lakes region who have done well in long distance running all have come from high-altitude areas, whereas those from low-altitude areas do not perform particularly well. He also argues that Koreans and Ecuadorians from high-altitude areas compete well with Kenyans in long-distance races. According to Graves, this suggests that it is the fact of having trained in a high altitude, combined with possible local level physiological adaptations to high-altitude environments that is behind the success in long distance running, not race.

Graves also argues that while it is superficially true that most of the world record-holders in the 100-meter dash are of West African heritage, they also all have partial genetic heritage from Europe and Native America, they have also all trained outside of West Africa, and West African nations have not trained any top-level runners. Graves says these factors make it impossible to say to which degree the success is best attributed to genetic or to environmental factors.

Views in the United States 
Various individuals, including scholars and sportswriters, have commented on the apparent over-representations and under-representations of different races in different sports. African Americans accounted for 75% of players in the National Basketball Association (NBA) near the end of 2008. According to the latest National Consortium for Academics and Sports equality report card, 65% of National Football League players were African Americans. However, in 2008, about 8.5% of Major League Baseball players were African American (who make up about 13% of the US population), and 29.1% were Hispanics of any race (compared with about 16% of the US population). In 2020, less than 5% of the National Hockey League (NHL) players are black or of mixed black heritage.

NCAA sports have mirrored the trends present in American professional sports. During the 2005–2006 season, black males comprised 46.9 percent of NCAA Football Bowl Subdivision (FBS) and 58.9 percent of NCAA Division I basketball. The NCAA statistics show a strong correlation between percentage of black athletes within a sport and the revenue generated by that sport. For example, University of North Carolina's 2007–2008 men's basketball team (the team was 59% black relative to the 3.7% black population of the institution as a whole) generated $17,215,199 in revenue, which comprised 30 percent of the school's athletic revenue for the year. Given NCAA rules prohibiting the payment of players, some have come to see the structure of NCAA athletics as exploitative of college athletes. Some believe that since black athletes comprise a high percentage of athletes in high revenue college sports (FBS football and Division I Men's basketball), they are therefore the biggest losers in this arrangement.  Billy Hawkins argues that "the control over the Black male's body and profiting off its physical expenditure is in the hands of White males." His position refers to a very high percentage of Division I universities controlled by white administrations that prosper greatly from the free labor produced by the revenue sports that are heavily populated by black athletes. This claim is substantiated by statistics, such as the 2005–2006 NCAA Division I men's basketball tournament in which games started, and minutes played for black athletes were over double that of their white counterparts, with 68.7 percent of scoring in the tournament coming from black players.

Despite the frequency of such speculation, suggestions of biological differences in athletic ability between racial groups are considered unscientific.

"Black athletic superiority" 
"Black athletic superiority" is the theory that black people possess certain traits that are acquired through genetic and/or environmental factors that allow them to excel over other races in athletic competition. Whites are more likely to hold these views; however, some blacks and other racial affiliations do as well. A 1991 poll in the United States indicated that half of the respondents agreed with the belief that "blacks have more natural physical ability".

Various hypotheses regarding racial differences of black and white people and their possible effect on sports performance have been put forth since the later part of the nineteenth century by professionals in many various fields. In the United States, attention to the subject faded over the first two decades of the twentieth century as black athletes were eliminated from white organized sport and segregated to compete among themselves on their own amateur and professional teams. Interest in the subject was renewed after the 1932 Summer Olympics in Los Angeles and Jesse Owens's record-breaking performances at the 1935 Big Ten Track Championships. Regarding Jesse Owens's impressive four-gold medal performance in the following 1936 Olympics, the then U.S head coach remarked that "The Negro excels. It was not long ago that his ability to sprint and jump was a life-and-death matter to him in the jungle. His muscles are pliable, and his easy going disposition is a valuable aid to the mental and physical relaxation that a runner and jumper must have."

In 1971, African-American sociologist Harry Edwards wrote: "The myth of the black male's racially determined, inherent physical and athletic superiority over the white male, rivals the myth of black sexual superiority in antiquity." Later in 2003, the JBHE Foundation published an article in The Journal of Blacks in Higher Education, where they pushed back against this idea of a "black gene" leading to black superiority in athletics, a concept referred to here as "Racist Theory". The JBHE contended that "If there is a 'black gene' that leads to athletic prowess, why then do African Americans, 90 percent of whom have at least one white ancestor, outperform blacks from African nations in every sport except long distance running?"

"East Asian athletic views" 
In the United States, East Asians are stereotyped as being physically and athletically inferior to other races. This has led to much discrimination in the recruitment process of professional American sports, which contributes to Asian American athletes being highly underrepresented in the majority of professional sports teams (a fact that has been noted by many sources). Professional basketball player Jeremy Lin believed that one of the reasons why he wasn't drafted by an NBA team was his race. This belief has been reiterated by sports writer Sean Gregory of Time magazine and NBA commissioner David Stern. In 2012, despite making up 6% of nation's population Asian American athletes only represented 2% of the NFL, 1.9% of the MLB and less than 1% of the NBA and NHL. Brandon Yip was the only player of Chinese descent playing professional hockey in the NHL in 2011. Basketball is a sport that noted for the fact that it has one of the lowest numbers of Asian athletes. This is despite the fact that the sport's color barrier was broken by Wataru Misaka in 1947, an Asian American athlete who was the first American racial minority to play in the NBA.

In American sports, there has been a higher representation of Asian American athletes who are of mixed racial heritage in comparison to those of full racial heritage such as former football player Roman Gabriel who was the first Asian-American to start as an NFL quarterback. Another fact to note is that a majority of Asian American athletes who are currently drafted/recruited to compete professionally tend to be in sports that require little to no contact.

Chinese views 
The idea among Chinese people that "genetic differences" cause Asian athletes to be "slower at sprinting" than their American, African or European rivals is "widely accepted". The People's Daily, a Chinese newspaper, wrote that Chinese are "suited" to sports that draw upon "agility and technique", such as table tennis, badminton, diving, and gymnastics. The newspaper said that Chinese people have "congenital shortcomings" and "genetic differences" that meant that they are disadvantaged at "purely athletic events" when competing against "black and white athletes". The success of hurdler Liu Xiang was explained by the hurdles event requiring technique which fit with the stereotype that Chinese are disciplined and intelligent. However, the recent successes of Chinese lightweight and middleweight weightlifters contradicts conventional belief, as weightlifting is one of the sports that demonstrates raw strength and explosive power best. Chinese and Korean professional weightlifters are especially overrepresented in olympic weightlifting, dominating international competitions such as weightlifting at the Summer Olympics and the International Weightlifting Federation.

Li Aidong, a researcher with the China Institute of Sports Science, said that sports coaches believed that Chinese athletes could have success in long jumping, high jumping and race walking. However, Li doubted that Chinese could compete in "pure sprinting", although there did not exist any "credible scientific studies" which supported the idea that "Asians" were disadvantaged in "sprinting". Professional sprinters Su Bingtian of China and Yoshihide Kiryū of Japan have contradicted this view of East Asians struggling to achieve quick footspeed, as both have broken the 10-second barrier in the 100 m and Su has ranked in the top five all-time fastest runners over 60 metres.

Explanations for participation and performance disparities

Physiological factors 

A 1994 examination of 32 English sport/exercise science textbooks found that seven suggested that there are biophysical differences due to race that might explain differences in sports performance, one expressed caution with the idea, and the other 24 did not mention the issue.

Socioeconomic factors 
In Stuck in the Shallow End: Education, Race, and Computing, UCLA researcher Jane Margolis outlines the history of segregation in swimming in the United States to show how people of colour have been affected up to the present day by inadequate access to swimming facilities and lessons. Margolis asserts that physiological differences between ethnic groups are relatively minor and says: "In most cases of segregation, stereotypes and belief systems about different ethnic gender groups' genetic make-up and physical abilities (and inabilities) emerge to rationalize unequal access and resulting disparities." According to Margolis, views regarding "buoyancy problems" of African Americans are merely part of folklore which have been passed down from generation to generation.  Joan Ferrante, a professor of sociology at Northern Kentucky University, suggests that geographic location, financial resources, and the influence of parents, peers, and role models are involved in channeling individuals of certain races towards particular sports and away from others.

Haplogroup inheritance 
Elite athletic capacity has also been correlated with differing patterns of haplogroup inheritance. Moran et al. (2004) observed that among Y-DNA (paternal) clades borne by elite endurance athletes in Ethiopia, the E*, E3*, K*(xP), and J*(xJ2) are positively correlated with elite athletic endurance performance, whereas the haplogroup E3b1 is significantly less frequent among the elite endurance athletes.

Citing haplogroup data from various previous studies, Ahmetov and Fedotovskaya (2012) report that the mtDNA (maternal) haplogroups I, H, L0, M*, G1, N9, and V have been positively correlated with elite athletic endurance performance, whereas the mtDNA haplogroups L3*, B, K, J2, and T are negatively correlated with athletic endurance performance. Japanese sprinters were also found to have a higher distribution of the mtDNA F.

Racial prejudices, discrimination, segregation, and integration 

The baseball color line, which included separate Negro league baseball, was one example of racial segregation in the United States.

In the United States, a study found that a form of racial discrimination exists in NBA basketball, as white players received higher salaries than do blacks related to actual performance.  Funk says this may be due to viewer discrimination. Viewership increases when there is greater participation by white players, which means higher advertising incomes. This explains much of the salary gap.

Researchers have looked at other evidence for sports consumer discrimination. One method is comparing the price of sports memorabilia, such as baseball cards. Another is looking at fan voting for all-star teams. Still another is looking at willingness to attend sporting events. The evidence is mixed, with some studies finding bias against blacks and others not. A bias, if it exists, may be diminishing and possibly disappearing, according to a study on fan voting for baseball all-star teams.

Major League Baseball 

Jackie Robinson was the first African American to play a major league game on April 15, 1947. Jackie loved the sport of baseball but that wasn't his only goal to make the majors. He wanted to make a way for more African Americans to join the league. However, with struggles of people being racist in the stands, players spouting off racial slang words to other players or fans, etc. Jackie wasn't discouraged to the hate as he was not only one of the best African Americans to play the game but one of the best in the history of baseball.

The under-representation of Blacks in U.S. baseball ended during the early years of the civil rights movement. The representation of different races in Major League Baseball has been increasing since 1947 according to Mark Armour and Daniel R Levitt of the Society for American Baseball Research. According to their research, African American representation reached its peak in 1984 when it reached 18.4%. However, the African American representation has been steadily decreasing since that point. As of 2016, the African American representation was down to 6.7%.

According to Armour and Levitt, the Latino representation has been steadily increasing since 1947. That year, the representation was only at 0.7%. Since that time, the Latino representation in baseball has increased substantially. As of 2016, the Latino representation was at 27.4%.

Asian American representation in baseball has been much less abundant throughout the game's history according to Armour and Levitt. Their representation in the Major League did not get over 1% until 1999 when their representation was at 1.2%. While the representation is increasing, it is doing so significantly slower than the other races. As of 2016 Asian American representation was only at 2.1%, a small increase from 1999.

According to Armour and Levitt, Whites make up the largest portion of the different races represented in the Major League. However, their representation has been steadily declining as the African American, Asian, and Latino representation has been steadily on the rise. The Society for American Baseball research shows that white representation was at 98.3% in 1947. Since then, representation has decreased to 63.7% in 2016.

In a journal titled Using Giddens's Structuration Theory to Examine the Waning Participation of African Americans in Baseball, it says "Numerous studies have shown that African-American youths are more likely than Whites to be encouraged and even directed to play basketball over other sports."

National Basketball Association 

Although Japanese-American Wataru Misaka broke the National Basketball Association's color barrier in the 1947–48 season when he played for the New York Knicks, 1950 is recognized as the year the NBA integrated. That year African-American players joined several teams; they included Chuck Cooper with the Boston Celtics, Nat "Sweetwater" Clifton with the New York Knicks, and Earl Lloyd with the Washington Bullets.

In another example from an interview with NBA Hall of Famer Kareem Abdul-Jabbar he states "For people of color, professional sports has always been a mirror of America's attitude toward race: as long as Black players were restricted from taking the field, then the rest of Black Americans would never truly be considered equal, meaning they would not be given equal educational or employment opportunities." Jabbar played in the NBA for 20 seasons dating back to 1969.

National Football League 

Black players participated in the National Football League from its inception in 1920; however, there were no African-American players from 1933 to 1946. There is a great deal of speculation as to why this "gentleman's agreement", as it came to be called, was implemented during this era. Some argue that it was purely because of the Great Depression. Jobs were difficult to come by, and thus race relations became increasingly strained as African-Americans, and other minorities, became perceived as "threats". Finally, in 1946, the Los Angeles Rams broke this unofficial "agreement" and drafted Kenny Washington along with Woody Strode in the same year. The final NFL team to break this agreement was the Washington Redskins, who signed Bobby Mitchell in 1962.

In October 2018, George Taliaferro, the first African American who played in the NFL died at the age of 91. While George was the first African American drafted to play in the NFL, the first African American would not be drafted as the Quarterback until 1953, when Willie Thrower was drafted to play with the Chicago Bears. It wouldn't be for another 14 years, 1967, until the first African American, Emlen Tunnell, would be elected for the NFL Hall of Fame.

National Hockey League 

On January 18, 1958, Willie O'Ree joined the Boston Bruins in a game against the Montreal Canadiens, breaking the color barrier and making history as the first ever black person to play in the National Hockey League since its founding in 1917. Some 16 years later, Mike Marson became the second black player to join the league with his expansion to the Washington Capitals. Decades later, a 2020 analysis revealed that people of color still comprise less than 5% of players in the National Hockey League and that out of 377 head coaches hired over 102 years, only one has been black.

Though black people are evidently under-represented in the National Hockey League, this is not at all reflective of their involvement in the sport and its development. In 1895–22 years before the establishment of the National Hockey League—the Colored Hockey League took form in Nova Scotia, Canada. This was hockey's first ever organized league, and at its peak contained hundreds of players throughout more than a dozen teams. The season ran from late January to early March as they were only allowed access to the ice rinks when the white-only leagues finished their seasons, leaving the Colored Hockey League with the worst of the ice conditions and subsequently with a much shorter season. Political and racial tensions forced the league to disintegrate in 1905 as they were no longer allowed to use arenas at all, regardless of the time of year. In 1921, the league re-formed on a smaller scale with just three teams but struggled to gain and keep traction. By the mid-1930s, the National Hockey League had become hugely popular while the Colored Hockey League had disappeared altogether.

Despite the many barriers imposed on the Colored Hockey League, they were reportedly just as competitive as the white-only leagues while demonstrating a faster and more aggressive style of play and making revolutionary contributions to the sport. The illustrious slapshot, for example, was invented by Colored Hockey League star Eddie Martin and later popularized by white players in the National Hockey League. Additionally, Henry "Braces" Franklyn was the first goalie to go down on to the ice to make saves; this 'butterfly style' was also popularized many years later by white players and remains a staple of the modern game.

Professional Golfers Association 
In 1961, the "Caucasians only" clause was struck from the Professional Golfers' Association of America constitution.

Throughout the game's history, golf has not included many African-American players, and they were often denied the opportunity to golf. However, many found a way to play the game anyway. According to an article by the African-American Registry titled African-Americans and Golf, a Brief History, "the Professional Golf Association of America (PGA) fought hard and until 1961, successfully maintained its all-white status. Black golfers (then) created their own organization of touring professionals."

Tiger Woods has had a major impact on the game of golf, especially among minorities. The article, African-Americans and Golf, a Brief History, states "With the ascent of Tiger Woods and his golf game comes an increased interest and participation from young minorities in the game. He himself envisions this impacting in the next ten years as they come of age and develop physically as well." Woods hopes minority participation will continue to increase in the future.

The research surrounding descriptions employed about White and Black athletes in the media and how the stereotypes of Black athletes has affected Tiger Woods in a majority white sport, because Tiger Woods was the only Black golfer on the PGA tour, he received different comments related to Black stereotypes that the other golfers on the tour did not.

African American participation in golf has been increasing. In a journal titled African American Culture and Physical Skill Development Programs: The Effect on Golf after Tiger Woods, it says "Smith (1997) reported data from a National Golf Foundation (NDF) study in the United States indicating there are 676,000 African-American golfers (2.7% of the 24.7 million golfers)."

As African-American participation increased, Asian participation in professional golf has also increased. According to an article by Golfweek titled Record Number of Asian Golfers Compete for Masters Glory, there were 10 golfers which was a tournament record.

According to the article Where are all the black golfers? Nearly two decades after Tiger Woods' arrival, golf still struggles to attract minorities, As of 2013 there were 25.7 million golfers: this was composed of 20.3 million whites, 3.1 million Hispanics, 1.3 million African-Americans, and 1 million Asian-Americans. The lack of diversity is still very apparent in golf today.

Positions of power: coaching and administration 
Referring to quarterbacks, head coaches, and athletic directors, Kenneth L. Shropshire of the Wharton School of the University of Pennsylvania has described the number of African Americans in "positions of power" as "woefully low". In 2000, 78% of players in the NBA were Black, but only 33% of NBA officials were minorities.  The lack of minorities in positions of leadership has been attributed to racial stereotypes as well "old boy networks" and white administrators networking within their own race.  In 2003, the NFL implemented the Rooney Rule, requiring teams searching for a new head coach to interview at least one minority candidate.

With an inadequate number of minorities in executive positions in the NFL, the NFL decided to revise the Rooney Rule to include teams to interview minorities for general manager positions. There has been backlash on how effective this rule has been and if there needs to be more revisions to this rule. As of 2022, there are only six minority head coaches in the NFL: Lovie Smith, Mike Tomlin, Ron Rivera, Robert Saleh, Todd Bowles, and Mike McDaniel. Because of racial discrimination, which AAP News & Journal defines as, "a form of social inequality that includes experiences resulting from legal and nonlegal systems of discrimination", it has resulted in unequal outcomes and a power struggle. A vast majority of the representation of minority coaches are held at positional or assistant coaches. With a lot of people [minorities] competing for head coaching positions with only a limited supply, it allows the very few minority head coaches to get handsomely salaries while the rest get average or low pay. Not only are finances an issue, the talent that is being presented is ultimately looked over because minorities coaches are not being hired and the NFL is meeting their status quo, of at least interviewing minorities for head coaching and general manager positions. Social networks also play a big role in how coaches are hired.

The power dynamics between the owners and players in the NFL has created racial inequality between the two groups. 30 owners are white while only two owners are of color (one is from Pakistan and one is Asian American). Richard Roth, sports attorney who has represented Peyton Manning, claimed, "22 of the teams in the NFL have been owned by the same person or family for at least 20 years". Dr. Richard Lapchick, director of the Institute for Diversity and Ethics in Sports, claimed, "Who owners invite into their fraternity-and its overwhelmingly a fraternity-is self-selective". Owners of teams must be very wealthy as teams "Cost upwards of $1B". Due to wealth inequality in the United States, there are few black billionaires who could be potential candidates. Furthermore, from a social class standpoint, it is very difficult for there to be a black owner as "very few black people are part of these billionaires' boys' clubs".

Many of the racial problems shown in sports are present because of the lack of diversity in ownership. The predominant presence of white male owners in sports drives a wedge between members of the organization. The narrative portrayed by ownership in sports paints the same picture of slave and owner from 400 years ago. NBA player Draymond Green ignited debates on the relationship between team ownership and players. In 2017, Green stated that the NBA should really consider the term "owner" and its usage dating back to chattel slavery, considering the majority of NBA players are black and nearly all team ownership is white. This has been a fact virtually the entire history of sports organizations. In 1994, Black people accounted for 80% of the NFL players, 65% of the NBA players, and 18% of the MLB players, but less than 10% of team ownership. 25 years later, the percentage of black athletes and team owners has not changed much with Black people accounting for 70% of the NFL players, 81% of the NBA players, and 8% of the MLB players. Team ownership is still below 10%. However, one thing that changed with time is the term for ownership in the NBA: NBA commissioner Adam Silver declared in June 2019 that the organization will no longer use the term "owner" and will now refer to owners as governors and partial owners as alternate governors.

Aside from a lack of black owners, owners make hundreds of times what the players make. This is similar to the NFL disparity between owners and the players. According to a report by the Green Bay Packers, the NFL earned $7,808,000 from TV deals, and split it among its 32 teams evenly. This means that each NFL owner "made $244m last year in 2016". By contrast, the "average NFL player made $2.1m in 2015". The owners of these teams are making hundreds of times what the players are. This is similar to the difference in pay between CEOs and average workers of corporations. Professor Pfeffer, a social inequality professor at the University of Michigan, claimed, "CEOs make more than 350 times what the average worker makes". The work of the owners is not hundreds of times more valuable than that of the players. However, it is the power dynamics and politics of the league structure that allow owners to make so much more.

Similar to the discrepancy between participation and leadership of blacks in American professional sports leagues, NCAA sports also have had a low percentage of administrators and coaches relative to the number of athletes. For example, during the 2005–2006 academic year, high revenue NCAA sports (basketball and football) had 51 percent black student athletes, whereas only 17 percent of head coaches in the same high revenue sports were black Also, in the same 2005–2006 year, only 5.5 percent of athletic directors at Division I "PWIs" (Primarily White Institutions), were black. Terry Bowden, a notable white Division I football coach, suggests that the reason many university presidents will not hire black coaches is "because they are worried about how alumni and donors will react." Bowden also refers to the "untapped talent" existing within the ranks of assistant coaches in Division I football. The data backs up this claim, with 26.9 percent of Division I assistant coaches during the 2005-06 year in men's revenue sports being black, a notably higher percentage than of head coaches. In terms of administrative positions, they have been concentrated largely in the hands of whites. As recently as 2009, 92.5 percent of university presidents in the FBS were white, 87.5 percent of athletic directors were white, and 100 percent of the conference commissioners were white. Despite these statistics, black head coaches have become more prevalent at the FBS level. As of 2012, there are now 15 black head coaches in FBS football, including now 3 in the SEC, a conference that did not hire its first black head coach until 2003.

Segregated seating 
In 1960, the Houston Oilers implemented a policy at Jeppesen Stadium to segregate the black fans from the white fans. Clem Daniels, Art Powell, Bo Roberson, and Fred Williamson of the Oakland Raiders refused to play in a stadium that had segregated seating.  The 1963 game against the New York Jets was relocated to a different stadium.

Mascot controversies 

The use of Native American names and imagery for sport mascots or in franchise memorabilia is an issue of ongoing discussion and controversy in American sports, as some Native American representatives have objected to such use without explicit negotiation and permission.

Washington Redskins 

In July 2020, due to mounting pressure from FedEx, who owned the naming rights of their stadium and dozens of shareholders, the Washington Redskins changed their team name to the Washington Football Team. The name was considered racist by many Native American groups.
In 2022, they rebranded as the Washington Commanders.

Controversy within The Atlanta Hawks 
The Atlanta Hawks has had multiple cases where racial discrimination has become an issue with the organization. In 2012 Bruce Levenson, majority ownership holder in the Atlanta Hawks NBA franchise, gave an evaluation in an email to other administration on the progress of the Atlanta Hawks game operations. In the email, Levenson states originally that game operations was not a concern but is now due to the lack of a season ticket base caused by the demographics of attendants at games and those involved with game operations. Levenson claims he was told because white males around 35–55 years of age and corporations are not the target of all aspects of game operations season tickets would not sell. When pressed for answers no one would not give Levenson any further assistance figuring out the issue. It was then he noticed 70% black attendees at games, black cheerleaders at the games, the music was hip-hop, customers at the arena bars were 90% black, few fathers and sons, and the concerts after games were either hip-hop or gospel.

Despite the email being sent to staff in 2012 it was not revealed until in an investigation of a second incident that included racist remarks in regards to Luol Deng (a British NBA player born in what is now South Sudan). In 2014 Danny Ferry was the President of the Atlanta Hawks franchise. In a scouting report on Luol Deng he stated that Deng displayed good traits on the outside but despite seems like a good person he's an African. Ferry goes on to compare Deng to "African store front that looks great but there's black market section in the back".

These problematic statements by both Danny Ferry and Bruce Levenson became the driving force behind the sell of the Atlanta Hawks.The Atlanta Hawks would be bought for approximately $730 – 850 million by Tony Ressler. Due to being overshadowed by a racial incident between Donald Sterling and the Los Angeles Clippers, the Hawks organization did not receive much publicity.

Promoting racial harmony and breaking stereotypes 
Racial differences in the NFL are also evident between player positions. According to an Undefeated article, all positions have remained strongly overrepresented by African American players in the period between 1999 and 2014, with African Americans outnumbering white Americans in several positions. However, this effect has been less pronounced for the center and quarterback positions: in 1999, the percentage of white players in the center position was 75% compared to 20% for African Americans, while the percentage of white players in the quarterback position was 81% compared to 18% for African American; though white Americans outnumbered African Americans in these positions, the percentages nonetheless showed significant overrepresentation of African Americans (~13% of the total population of the US) among both center and quarterback players compared to white Americans (~82% of the total population). In 2014, the center position showed more proportionate representation―with 81% being white and 16% African American―while the number of white quarterback players had decreased slightly within the same time frame (coinciding with a 1% increase in black quarterbacks). A study by the University of Colorado examining racial stereotypes towards NFL quarterbacks found that "black participants stereotyped both races more strongly...suggesting that black players may not believe they are cut out to be a professional quarterback". The study goes on to say that, "the terms physical strength and natural ability were more associated with the black quarterbacks while leadership and intelligence was more associated with white quarterbacks". These biases are thought to reflect how football players are viewed by the general populace, and ostensibly have an impact on perceptions among adolescents as well.

According to William Jeynes, a professor of education at California State University, Long Beach, the gathering at the first Thanksgiving in the United States was an attempt to create racial harmony through games and sporting contests that included running, shooting and wrestling. Huping Ling, a professor of history at Truman State University, has asserted that the participation of Chinese students in sports helped break local stereotypes in the St. Louis area during the 1920s. This history of racial tension in the competition between whites and minority groups shows an attempt to prove the humanity, equality, and even occasionally their superiority on the playing field. By doing so, groups of minorities hoped that sports would serve as a source for racial pride that would eventually lead to upward social mobility. However, as early as 1984, criticism has been levied against these ideas. Sports sociologist Harry Edwards openly criticized African Americans as being "co-conspirators" in their own children's exploitation by the white dominated sports establishment. Despite the perception of a white dominated sports establishment, research has shown that there is greater emphasis on sports as a potential career path in the African American community compared to the White community. Edwards continued by arguing that placing so much emphasis on sports achievement as a way for minority groups, specifically referring to African Americans, to achieve some level of prominence is de-emphasizing the importance of intellectual pursuits. Despite the conflicting perceptions of sports as a harmonizing instrument, many researchers still believe that not much has changed to alleviate the racially tense landscape many believe to be inherent in current day society.

Black Women + Bobsledding 
Bobsledding has much representation for Black women. At the 2018 Winter Olympics, Nigerian and Jamaican bobsled teams debuted. The United States, Britain, Canada, and Germany also have Black women compete in bobsledding at the Olympic level. The high diversity is somewhat due to bobsledding recruiting athletes from other sports, especially track.

Black women who have competed in bobsled include: Vonetta Flowers, Elana Meyers Taylor, Lauryn Williams, and Sylvia Hoffman.

Racial activism in American professional sports 
Racial activism has been found in many of professional sports leagues such as the National Basketball Association and the National Football League.

National Basketball Association 
Following the emergence of the Trayvon Martin case, NBA players including LeBron James, Dywane Wade, Chris Bosh, and other Miami Heat players at the time posed for a picture in hoodies, the outfit that Trayvon Martin was wearing when killed. In December 2014, LeBron James and other Cleveland Cavaliers including Kyrie Irving wore black t-shirts featuring the quote "I CANT BREATHE" following the death of Eric Garner who was put in a choke hold by a New York police officer. Since then, LeBron James has been in public disputes Via Twitter and Instagram, shaming Donald Trump and news analyst Laura Ingraham who openly told LeBron James to "shut up and dribble", suggesting that LeBron is only good for his athletic abilities. LeBron then went and turned that slogan "Shut up and dribble" into the Title of his Showtime Series that aired in October 2018. The show focuses on athletes who are shifting the narrative of what it means to be a black athlete in the sense that nowadays more and more athletes are speaking up on political and racial topics going on in the United States.

National Football League 

In a 2016 pre-season game against the San Diego Chargers, Colin Kaepernick, a quarterback for the San Francisco 49ers, chose to kneel instead of standing in solidarity with his teammates for the National Anthem. He did this to raise awareness for victims of police brutality and oppression of minorities in America. Many people believe Kaepernick is a hero for raising awareness for important social issues. However, his actions caused a massive backlash by fans and the media who decried him for acting anti American and disrespecting American troops. Furthermore, players from other teams began to kneel instead of stand with the national anthem. When questioned by the media, he claimed, "I am not going to stand up to show pride in a flag for a country that oppresses black people and people of color." He continued, "If they take football away, my endorsements from me, I know that I stood up for what is right." According to NFL policy, "There is no rule saying players must stand during the national anthem".

Kaepernick's act inspired many other players to also kneel during the national anthem. Bob McNair, owner of the Houston Texans, claimed, "They can't have the inmates running the prison" during a meeting with owners and no current players. After the meeting finished, Troy Vincent, former cornerback for the Miami Dolphins, claimed, "In all my years of playing in the NFL, I have been called every name in the book, including the N-word-but never felt like an inmate". Many players took to social media to protest the racist rhetoric of Bob McNair. Richard Sherman tweeted in response, "I can appreciate ppl being candid. Don't apologize! You meant what you said. Showing true colors allows ppl to see you for who you are". Damon Harrison Sr. tweeted, "...Did that wake some of y'all up now?".

Kaepernick claimed to be blackballed by all 32 teams following being released for his on the field protest in support of the Black Lives Matter movement. Ads following his release have focused on a simple tagline "Believe in something. Even if it means sacrificing everything." In 2019, Hip Hop artist and businessman Jay-Z partnered with the NFL in promoting their social justice efforts. As a supporter Kaepernick's efforts to protest police brutality against the black people of America, Jay-Z became an intermediary between the NFL and the black community. Alongside NFL commissioner Roger Goodell, Jay-Z has made efforts to make things right in the relationship between Kaepernick and the NFL by arranging a workout for the former 49ers QB to showcase his talents to all teams in need of a Quarterback. Later in 2019, Kaepernick and the NFL agreed to hold a workout session to showcase Kaepknick's talents as a competitive Quarterback and potential Super Bowl contender. Many disagreements about the transparency of the workout and accusations that Kaeperknick simply wants to manipulate the situation for profit circulate around social media. Kaeperknick remains without a team despite many teams' need for a Quarterback.

Issues in sports commentating 
Racial remarks have been made about athletes of color throughout history. Radio host Don Imus described the Rutgers University women's basketball team as "nappy-headed hos" on his radio program "Imus in the Morning" in 2007. Later on he proclaimed that the match-up between Rutgers and their opponents looked like a showdown of the "jigaboos versus the wannabes."

In 1988 sports commentator Jimmy "the Greek" Snyder proclaimed his theory on why Black Americans are more athletic than White Americans: "The black is a better athlete to begin with because he's been bred to be that way, because of his high thighs and big thighs that goes up into his back, and they can jump higher and run faster because of their bigger thighs and he's bred to be the better athlete because this goes back all the way to the Civil War when during the slave trade … the slave owner would breed his big black to his big woman so that he could have a big black kid …"

Snyder would later express regret for his comments shortly after they aired, telling The Washington Post that "I thought I was being instructive, when in fact, I was destructive".

Snyder was later fired by CBS.

Sherman Maxwell was the first African American sports broadcaster. He began his career in 1929 on WNJ radio. He was known as "the voice of Newark".

Portrayals in film 
While there are discrepancies in "based on a true story" sports movies, the movies are still representing the harsh realities of race and sports well. The US-set films Hoosiers and Rudy have been described as memorializing the "golden age of sports" as a time of white prevalence and dominance, while Glory Road showed a white coach helping to dissolve the color barrier in college basketball.

Another movie that received critical acclaim was 42. This movie was the Jackie Robinson story, a young man who was the first black player in the MLB. This movie focused on the journey Robinson took throughout his first year in the major leagues, going through the ups and downs. There were some moments that critics felt like producers could have given more depth to different characters, but overall the film represented that time in America and sports well.

Invictus deals with the subject of the 1995 Rugby World Cup in post-apartheid South Africa.

Some movies about black athletes don't focus completely on the aspect of race. The 2001 movie Ali, a film about great boxer Muhammed Ali, was another story about the journey through his life, but only briefly focused on racial aspects. There were mentions of some of his career being after the assassinations of Malcom X and Martin Luther King Jr, but most of the film reflected on Ali and his personal journey that had little to do with the color of his skin.

Australia 

Inequality in sport for the Aboriginal Australians exists due to material barriers. A 2007 report by the Australian Human Rights Commission suggested that fear of "racial vilification" was partly responsible for the under-representation of Aboriginal and other ethnic groups in Australian sports.

In the recent years, the influence of Polynesian players on the NRL National Rugby League has grown, with figures from the 2011 season showing that 35% of NRL players and over 45% of NRL Under-20s players are of Polynesian background. (By way of comparison, less than 3% of the Australian population identified themselves as Polynesian in the 2021 Australian census). This increase in Polynesian players has been blamed for the decline of Indigenous players, dropping from 21% in the 1990s to 11% for the 2009 season.

At the elite level of the game, Aboriginal Australians represented 35% of the roster for the Kangaroos, 21% of players at the 2012 State of Origin series, 12% of NRL players and a further 8% of the NRL Under-20s players. By way of comparison, 2.3% of the Australian population identified themselves as Indigenous in the 2006 Australian census.

South Africa 
In South Africa, black representation on the cricket and rugby national sports teams is ensured via the introduction of quotas.

United States 
Discussions of race and sports in the United States, where the two subjects have always been intertwined in American history, have focused to a great extent on African Americans. Depending on the type of sport and performance level, African Americans are reported to be over- or under-represented. African Americans compose the highest percentage of the minority groups active at the professional level, but are among those who show the lowest participation overall.

In 2013, while 2.8% of full-time degree-pursuing undergraduates were black men, the group comprised 57% of college football teams, and 64% of men's basketball players, according to Shaun R. Harper. While blacks predominate in football and basketball, whites predominate in all other regulated sports.

A 2001 study indicated that black high school students play harder than white students, because the former were more likely to perceive sports as a venue to success. The study denies that racial characteristics, per se, is a factor in success in sports.

For all races and sports, from 3.3% (basketball) to 11.3% (ice hockey) are successful in making the transition from high school varsity to an NCAA team. From .8% (men's ice hockey) to 9.4% (baseball) successfully transition from NCAA to professional teams. Therefore, the overall success rate of high school athletes progressing to professional athletes was from .03% (men and women's basketball) to .5% (baseball). The annual number of NCAA athletes drafted into professional sports annually varied from seven (men's ice hockey) to 678 (baseball).

Unlike black athletes, blacks as a group have not perceived sports as an important venue to prosperity.
There are higher participation rates by blacks as well as higher numbers of people in non-athletic endeavor, such as policy, teaching, physicians, lawyers, engineers, and architects.

Athletics have been increasingly subsidized by tuition. Only one in eight of the 202 Division I colleges actually netted more money than they spent on athletics between the years 2005 and 2010. At the few money making schools, football and sometimes basketball sales support the school's other athletic programs. The amount spent on an athlete in one of the six highest-profile football conferences, on average, is six times more than the amount spent to educate the non-athlete. Spending per student varied from $10,012 to $19,225; cost per athlete varied from $41,796 to $163,930.

See also 
 Rugby union and apartheid
 Al Campanis controversy
 Howard Cosell controversy
 Marge Schott controversy
 Jimmy Snyder controversy
 10-second barrier
 1968 Olympics Black Power salute
 Black participation in college basketball
 Black players in American professional football
 History of African Americans in the Canadian Football League
 Melanin theory
 Glory Road (film)
 Race and ethnicity in the NHL
 Iowa Colored Cowboys

References

Further reading
 
 
 
 
 
 
 
 
 Martin, Charles.  Benching Jim Crow: The Rise and Fall of the Color Line in Southern College Sports, 1890-1980 (2010).  excerpt
 
 
 

Race (human categorization)
Sports science
Sports controversies
Sports culture